

The Autostichinae are a subfamily of moths in the superfamily Gelechioidea. Like their relatives therein, their exact relationships are not yet very well resolved. The present lineage was often included in the concealer moth family (Oecophoridae), but alternatively it is united with the Symmocidae sensu stricto (and often also the Holcopogonidae and/or certain genera otherwise considered twirler moths, e.g. Deoclona and Syringopais) to form an expanded family Autostichidae (in the past also referred to as family Symmocidae).

Selected genera
Genera in this subfamily are:

 Anaptilora Meyrick, 1904
 Autosticha Meyrick, 1886 (including Epicoenia, Semnolocha)
 Demiophila Meyrick, 1906
 Deroxena Meyrick, 1913
 Diophila Meyrick, 1937
 Encrasima Meyrick, 1916
 Galagete B.Landry, 2002
 Heliangara Meyrick, 1906
 Ischnodoris Meyrick, 1911
 Lasiodictis Meyrick, 1912
 Nephantis Meyrick, 1905
 Pachnistis Meyrick, 1907
 Parallactis Meyrick, 1925
 Procometis Meyrick, 1890
 Protobathra Meyrick, 1916
 Ptochoryctis Meyrick, 1894
 Pudahuelia Urra, 2013
 Sipsa Diakonoff, 1955
 Stereosticha Meyrick, 1913
 Stochastica Meyrick, 1938
 Stoeberhinus – potato moth
 Trichloma Lower, 1902

Also placed here by some authors is Syndesmica, which is otherwise assigned to subfamily Dichomeridinae of the twirler moths (Gelechiidae). The same was true for Anaptilora, which is mostly included here.

Footnotes

References

  (2008): Australian Faunal Directory – Autostichinae. Version of 2008-OCT-09. Retrieved 2011-OCT-17.
  (2011): Autostichinae. Version 2.4, 2011-JAN-27. Retrieved 2011-OCT-17.

External links
 

 
Autostichidae
Moth subfamilies